Natural Hospital Birth is a pregnancy guide for women who wish to achieve a natural birth in a hospital setting.  Written by Cynthia Gabriel and published by Harvard Common Press in 2011 and updated in a second edition with Quarto Press in 2018.

Format 
The book is geared towards women who desire to have a natural birth, and outlines how she will be able to do this in a hospital. Currently only 2% of women have a natural hospital birth. The book provides example birthing plans and how to effectively work with and communicate with hospital staff.  Many chapters focus on creating a supportive team and feeling safe during the birthing process.  The book highlights the importance of feeling empowered during birth and also encourages the reader to release any fears about childbirth and avoid unnecessary interventions.  A natural hospital birth is defined in this book as having the least amount of medical intervention and the most instinctive, self-directed birth possible all of this while in hospital setting with medical technology on stand by.  The book reminds the reader to have "the best of both worlds" while considering her birthing plan.

About the Author 
Cynthia Gabriel earned her doctorate in medical anthropology from the University of California, Santa Cruz.  She worked in a Russian maternity hospital accompanying midwives.  She is a mother of three, an anthropologist, a professor, and a doula. Gabriel also conducts research at the University of Michigan's Institute for Research on Women and Gender.

U.S. Birthing Statistics 
50% of women experience induction of labor

76% of women have an epidural during birth

22% of women are given narcotics during birth

83% of women are given an I.V. during birth

References 

 http://cwonline.squarespace.com/storage/journal-issue-47/Cynthia%20Gabrielweb%2047.pdf
 http://togrow.org/book.html
 https://www.amazon.com/Natural-Hospital-Birth-Best-Worlds/dp/1558327177
 http://thebirthmuse.momaroo.com/
 http://www.childbirthconnection.org/pdfs/LTMII_report.pdf

Handbooks and manuals
Works about human pregnancy
Natural childbirth
2011 non-fiction books